Aqchay-e Olya (also Romanized as Āqchāy-e ‘Olyā and Āq Chāy ‘Olyā; also known as Āgh Chāy Bālā, Akchay-Ulia, Āqā Chāy-e Bālā, Aqchāi Ulia, Āq Chāy, and Āq Chāy-e Bālā) is a village in Yurchi-ye Sharqi Rural District, Kuraim District, Nir County, Ardabil Province, Iran. At the 2006 census, its population was 43, in 8 families.

References 

Tageo

Towns and villages in Nir County